¿Quién es la máscara? is a Chilean  reality singing competition television series based on the South Korean television series King of Mask Singer. The first season premiered on November 1, 2021, and concluded on November 28, 2021. The second season premiered on November 29, 2021, and concluded on December 21, 2021. The third season premiered on December 27, 2021, and concluded on January 19, 2022.

The show features celebrities singing songs while wearing head-to-toe costumes and face masks concealing their identities. It employs panelists who guess the celebrities' identities by interpreting clues provided to them throughout the series.

Overview

Host and panelists 
Journalist Julián Elfenbein was announced as the main host of the program while, the announced panelists consist of actor Cristián Riquelme, presenter Cristián Sánchez, actress María Elena Swett, and journalist Macarena Pizarro.

Format 
Twelve celebrities compete in costumes to hide their identities. In each episode, the competitors are divided into duels or otherwise, in which each one performs a song of their choice. In each confrontation, the audience in the studio votes and the winner of those fights remains in competition, while the loser is at risk. At the end of each episode, the losers or masks at risk face off by singing and the panelists determine who will be unmasked and who will stay in the running. The eliminated celebrity will then remove their mask to reveal their identity.

Season 1

Episodes

Week 1 (1 and 2 November)

Week 2 (7, 8, and 9 November)

Week 3 (14 & 15 November)

Week 4 (22 and 23 November)

Week 5 (28 November)

Season 2

Episodes

Week 1 (29 & 30 November)

Week 2 (5, 6, & 7 December)

Week 3 (12, 13 & 14 December)

Week 4 (20 & 21 December)

Season 3

Week 1 (27 & 28 December)

Week 2 (9, 10, 11 & 12 January)

Week 3 (16, 17, 18, & 19 January)

References

2021 Chilean television series debuts
Chilevisión original programming
Chilean reality television series
Spanish-language television shows
2020s Chilean television series
Masked Singer